Garth Ennis (born January 16, 1970) is a Northern Irish–American comics writer, best known for the Vertigo series Preacher with artist Steve Dillon, his nine-year run on Marvel Comics' Punisher franchise, and The Boys with artist Darick Robertson. He has collaborated with artists such as Dillon and Glenn Fabry on Preacher, John McCrea on Hitman, Marc Silvestri on The Darkness, and Carlos Ezquerra on both Preacher and Hitman. His work has won him recognition in the comics industry, including nominations for the Comics Buyer's Guide Award for Favorite Writer in 1997, 1998, 1999, and 2000.

Early life
Ennis is originally from Northern Ireland.

Raised with no religion, Ennis's first exposure to the idea of God was as a six-year-old in primary school. Ennis's teacher told the class that God was a being who could see inside their hearts, was always around them, and would ultimately reward or punish them. Ennis described the idea as bewildering, strange and terrifying. He later used this experience in his comic book series, Preacher, whose protagonist is slapped after telling his grandmother that he finds the concept of God "scary." Although the fictional violence in that story was not reflected in Ennis's real-life upbringing, his classmates later reassured each other that they all loved God, though Ennis said, "I think I hate him." Ennis later asked his mother about God, and when she asked him what he thought about the idea, Ennis responded, "It sounds kind of stupid," a statement the adult Ennis clarified was meant to mask his fear. His mother's response was, "Well, there you are, then."

In 1987, Ennis befriended artist John McCrea while shopping at the first comic book specialty shop in Belfast, which had been opened by McCrea and another friend. Ennis would later ask McCrea to illustrate his first professional comics project. It was here that Ennis first met comics writer Alan Moore, who advised him to focus on creator-owned work rather than letting comic companies take ownership of his intellectual property.

Career

UK work
Ennis began his comic-writing career on his nineteenth birthday in 1989, with the series Troubled Souls in the British anthology Crisis. Illustrated by Ennis's friend John McCrea, as living in Northern Ireland meant he did not require reference material for the Belfast-based series, it tells the story of a young, apolitical Protestant man caught up by fate in the violence of the Irish Troubles. It spawned a sequel, For a Few Troubles More, a broad comedy featuring two supporting characters from Troubled Souls, Dougie and Ivor. In 1997, American publisher Caliber released Dicks, serving as another Dougie and Ivor adventure. Several follow-ups featuring these characters were subsequently published by Avatar Press.

In explaining why he chose to write Troubled Souls as his debut comics work, Ennis explained, "It was the kind of thing that was doing well at the time. I ought to be completely clear and say that, with hindsight, what Troubled Souls really represented was naked ambition. It was a direct attempt to get published. And that was the road that seemed most likely to lead me to success."

Another series for Crisis was True Faith, a religious satire inspired by his school days, drawn by Warren Pleece. A collected edition was issued in 1990 but a series of complaints from churches and religious groups led to it being quickly withdrawn from sale. It was republished in 1997 by the U.S. DC Comics imprint Vertigo. The plot follows an atheist teenager attending Christian school. After publicly insulting his classmates' religion to get back at a girl he was interested in who did not return his romantic feelings, the boy attracts the attention of a maltheist and is coerced into helping him murder clergy and bomb churches. Following the death of the maltheist, the book ends with the atheistic hero willingly carrying out a shooting at his Christian school. In the introduction to the Vertigo edition, Ennis described this as wish-fulfillment. Shortly after, Ennis began to write for the UK comics series 2000 AD, and later wrote stories for the title's flagship character, Judge Dredd, taking over from creator John Wagner for several years. Ennis's Dredd stories include "Muzak Killer", a pastiche of mainstream pop music; "Emerald Isle", a tongue-in-cheek story set in Ennis's native Ireland; and the 20-part "Judgment Day". Ennis also contributed the story "Time Flies", with artist Philip Bond, dealing with time-travel paradoxes and Nazis.

In 2001, following much work in the United States, Ennis briefly returned to UK comics to write the Judge Dredd story "Helter Skelter". Ennis said afterward there was "not a hope" to his returning to writing Dredd as he was generally not happy with his run. "I'm too close to Dredd. I like him too much. I can't tamper with the formula; nor can I take the piss the way I do with superheroes".

DC Comics

In 1991, Ennis took over the horror series Hellblazer, from DC Comics' Vertigo imprint. He wrote the series through 1994, with Steve Dillon becoming the regular artist during the second half of Ennis's run; Ennis and Dillon would later become regular collaborators on other comics, including the one-shot Heartland, exploring one of Hellblazers secondary characters. Years afterward, Ennis briefly returned to Hellblazer for the five-part "Son of Man" story with artist John Higgins.

Ennis and Dillon went on to create the 66-issue Vertigo series Preacher. Running from 1995 to 2000, Preacher has been cited as Ennis's landmark work. Its plot concerns a preacher with supernatural powers who literally searches for the Christian God, who had abandoned His creation. Mixing influences from Western and horror films with twisted humor and religious satire, it drew plaudits for Ennis from all sections of the media; the Guardian newspaper voted one of the Preacher collections its book of the week, and film director Kevin Smith described it as "more fun than going to the movies." The AMC television series Preacher, adapted from the comic, premiered in 2016. From 1993 to 1995, Ennis worked with artist John McCrea on another DC title, The Demon, during which the duo introduced superpowered contract killer Tommy Monaghan, a character Ennis and McCrea would go on to do in the character's own title, Hitman. With the exception of a reverent depiction of Superman, Ennis's writing on Hitman was known for portraying superheroes as ridiculous, a characteristic common in Ennis material involving such characters. Hitman ran 60 issues from 1996 to 2001. Ennis also penned several Hitman specials and spinoffs. Following the main title's cancellation, Ennis and McCrea returned to the world of Hitman for a Justice League crossover, and later a comedic miniseries following the supporting characters from Hitman, entitled Section Eight.

Other DC comics projects Ennis wrote include Bloody Mary for the Helix imprint; a run on The Authority for the Wildstorm imprint; and the first arc of the Authority spin-off series Midnighter, as well as a story for the series Unknown Soldier and the original creations Goddess and Pride & Joy, all for the Vertigo imprint.

Marvel Comics
Ennis's first work for Marvel was Punisher Kills the Marvel Universe in 1995. Ennis noted that he quit writing for Marvel afterwards, as the dialogue in this comic had been altered without his consultation. Following the end of Hitman, Ennis was once again offered the chance to write The Punisher at Marvel. The initial 12-issue miniseries was illustrated by Steve Dillon, who also illustrated much of Ennis's subsequent 37-issue run of the Marvel Knights  Punisher series. No longer finding violence comedic in light of the September 11th terrorist attacks, Ennis relaunched The Punisher under Marvel's MAX imprint, allowing for darker stories. His 60-issue run was released concurrently with several Ennis-penned Punisher miniseries such as Born and Barracuda, and the one-shots The End, The Cell, and The Tyger. The creators of Punisher: War Zone have attributed Ennis's The Punisher MAX run as one of the major influences on the film, and Ennis and Dillon reunited for a Punisher: War Zone miniseries to tie-in with the film.

In 2008, Ennis ended his five-year run on the MAX imprint's Punisher series to write the Marvel miniseries War Is Hell: The First Flight of the Phantom Eagle. Illustrated by Howard Chaykin, it featured the little-used character Phantom Eagle, a World War I pilot. Other series Ennis wrote for Marvel include Where Monsters Dwell, Spider-Man, Ghost Rider, Hulk, Thor, and a series of Goran Parlov-illustrated Nick Fury stories under the MAX imprint. These stories stripped superspy Fury of his science-fiction trappings in favor of  military and CIA situations, including a focus on the First Indochina War in one storyline.

Independent publishers and creator-owned work
Ennis has written a 2008 Dan Dare miniseries published by Virgin Comics, and origin stories for The Darkness for Image Comics and Shadow Man for Valiant Comics. Original comics Ennis has created include the 5-issue mini-series Seven Brothers for Virgin Comics, on which Ennis collaborated with film director John Woo, a vulgar superhero satire entitled The Pro for Image Comics, the post-apocalyptic Just a Pilgrim for Black Bull Press, and War Stories for DC and later Avatar Press.

Avatar has published the bulk of Ennis's creator-owned material, which includes the post-9/11 war story 303, a western  entitled Streets of Glory, the extreme horror comic Crossed, Back to Brooklyn, a crime limited series co-written with Jimmy Palmiotti for Image Comics, Caliban, a science fiction horror series inspired by the movie Prometheus, and Chronicles of Wormwood, which dealt with the friendship between an African-American Jesus Christ and a benign Antichrist. In 2011, Avatar commissioned Ennis to write and direct an original short film, Stitched, produced to drum up support for a possible feature. Ennis was also the initial writer for the Stitched comic book tie-in, also published by Avatar.

Ennis has also done both creator-owned and commissioned work for Dynamite Entertainment, most notably The Boys.  Mainly illustrated by co-creator Darick Robertson, who Ennis previously worked with on the Marvel series Fury: Peacemaker and Punisher: Born, The Boys ran for 72 issues before concluding in 2012. This creator-owned extended series was a superhero satire, bringing the genre to places far darker than Ennis had before, by not only portraying superheroes as ridiculous, but also amoral, malevolent, and deviant. Announced in 2006 and originally published by DC's Wildstorm imprint, The Boys was initially cancelled after six issues. Ennis later explained that this was because DC Comics were uneasy with the anti-superhero tone of the work. The series was subsequently picked up by Dynamite. The series was successful and spawned spinoffs, including a mini-series focused on the anti-hero Billy Butcher. In 2019, The Boys was adapted into a TV series by Amazon.

Other original projects for Dynamite include the Howard Chaykin-illustrated crime comic Red Team and a metaseries of war comics called Battlefields, made up of mini-series including Night Witches, Dear Billy, and Tankies. In terms of commissioned material, Ennis wrote the pulp character The Shadow for Dynamite. In a surprise move, Ennis attempted to crowdfund a children's book through the Kickstarter platform. Unable to secure a children's book publisher due to its violent ending, Erf as the book became known, was ultimately published by Dynamite.

Ennis wrote Sara in October 2018 for TKO Studios, a war story following a team of female Russian snipers as they beat back the Nazi invaders during a brutal winter campaign on the WWII Eastern Front.

Ennis wrote Stringbags in 2020 for the U. S. Naval Institute.  The graphic novel relates the adventures of Allied airmen who crewed a Swordfish airplane during World War II.

Influences and views on comics
Ennis has explained that as an avid reader of British war comics during his formative years, he did not read superhero comics until his late teens, at which point he found them ridiculous, although he frequently cites mid-eighties superhero material among his influences. For instance, Ennis noted that the first American comic book he read in its entirety and appreciated was The Dark Knight Returns by Frank Miller, an author who would prove influential on Ennis's subsequent work, with Ennis citing Miller's portrayal of Nick Fury in Elektra: Assassin as his model for writing the character. Ennis said he was "blown away" by Miller, as The Dark Knight Returns was the first time he encountered a comic writer who approached his work like a novelist. While Ennis was already interested in a creative profession, Frank Miller's material and other mid-eighties mature readers comics like Swamp Thing and Love and Rockets inspired him to look into specifically writing comics as a career.

Despite being influenced by superhero material and having written a number of superhero stories both for and outside Marvel and DC, Ennis is noted for subverting the genre and mocking the characters in this work. For example, in the 1995 one-shot special Punisher Kills the Marvel Universe, Ennis has the Punisher kill every single superhero and supervillain on Earth. As a World War II aficionado, Ennis also said he finds characters like Captain America "borderline offensive, because to me the reality of World War II was very human people, ordinary flesh-and-blood guys who slogged it out in miserable, flooded foxholes. So adding some fantasy superhero narrative, that has always annoyed me a little bit." Nonetheless, Ennis has admitted to having appreciation for the idea behind Wonder Woman if not the character, and even to outright liking Superman, the latter of whom he was noted for writing respectfully in Hitman. Ennis has since explained that his issue with superhero comics is not over the genre in and of itself, but more over its dominance in the comic book industry and the constraints imposed on superhero stories by publishers. "I find most superhero stories completely meaningless," Ennis said. "Which is not to say I don’t think there’s potential for the genre – Alan Moore and Warren Ellis have both done interesting work with the notion of what it might be like to be and think beyond human, see Miracleman, Watchmen and Supergod. But so long as the industry is geared towards fulfilling audience demand – ie, for the same brightly coloured characters doing the same thing forever – you’re never going to see any real growth. The stories can’t end, so they’ll never mean anything."

Ennis has remarked that in terms of Marvel and DC characters, he prefers the ones he describes as more grounded, such as the Punisher, John Constantine, and Nick Fury. In particular, Ennis describes the Punisher as resembling the British comics characters he loved as a child more than Marvel and DC superheroes, which provided him with a way to the character. Though his Constantine stories, such as "Dangerous Habits" (1991), are widely acclaimed, Ennis grew to dislike the character. He told Vulture in 2014 that he had come to find Constantine morally repulsive and had "no desire to write a character who essentially gets his pals killed and then explains that they were doomed anyway, so why not just spend their lives and use them up."

Personal life
Ennis had become a citizen of the United States by July 2016.

Ennis is an atheist, and said he feels disdain toward religion. Ennis blamed growing up in Northern Ireland during the Troubles for influencing this attitude. While he was not directly involved in the conflict as a child, Ennis would hear about it each morning on the radio. Ennis has related that having been raised secular, religiously motivated violence made no sense as to him, characterizing such conflict as a disagreement among participants over "how to worship their imaginary friend. That more than anything gave me my distrust of religion."

Ennis has maintained an interest in military history since childhood, inspired by the war comics from his youth.

Awards

 1997 National Comics Award for Best Writer
1997 UK Comic Art Award for Best Writer (for Hitman, Preacher, and Saint of Killers)
1997 UK Comic Art Award for Best Collection (for Preacher: Gone to Texas)
1998 Eisner Award for Best Writer (for Hitman, Preacher, Unknown Soldier and Blood Mary: Lady Liberty)
1998 Eisner Award for Best Single Issue (for Hitman #34: "Of Thee I Sing")
1999 Eagle Award for Favorite Color Comic Book (for Preacher)
2001 National Comics Award for Best Supporting Character (for Natt The Hat, from Hitman)
2021 Irish Comics News Award for Best Irish Writer (for "Hellmann at the Twilight of the Reich" in Action 2020)

Nominations
1993 Eisner Award for the Best Writer (for Hellblazer)
1994 Eisner Award for the Best Writer (for Hellblazer)
1996 Eisner Award for the Best Writer (for Preacher and Goddess)
1997 Comics Buyer's Guide Fan Award for Favorite Writer
1997 UK Comic Art Awards for Best Original Graphic Novel (for Preacher Special) 
1998 Comics Buyer's Guide Fan Award for Favorite Writer
1999 Eagle Award for Favourite Comics Writer
1999 Eagle Award for Favourite Comics Character (for Jesse Custer)
1999 Comics Buyer's Guide Award for Favorite Writer
2000 Comics Buyer's Guide Award for Favorite Writer
2001 Eisner Award for Best Writer (for Preacher)
2001 Eisner Award for Best Serialized Story (for Preacher #59–66)
2001 Comics Buyer's Guide Award for Favorite Writer
2002 Comics Buyer's Guide Award for Favorite Writer
2002 National Comics Award for Best Writer in Comics Today
2003 Comics Buyer's Guide Award for Favorite Writer

Bibliography

Fleetway
Titles published by Fleetway include:
Crisis:
Troubled Souls (with John McCrea, in #15–20 and 22–27, 1989) collected as Troubled Souls (tpb, 96 pages, 1990)
Suburban Hell:
 "The Unusual Obsession of Mrs. Orton" (with Phillip Swarbrick, in #36, 1990)
 "The Ballad of Andrew Brown" (with Phil Winslade, in #43, 1990)
 "Light Me" (with Phil Winslade, in #61, 1991)
 "Charlie Lives with... Fang and Snuffles" (with Ian Oldham, in #62, 1991)
True Faith (with Warren Pleece, in #29–34 and 36–38, 1989–1990) collected as True Faith (tpb, 96 pages, 1990)
For a Few Troubles More (with John McCrea, in #40–43 and 45–46, 1990) collected as For a Few Troubles More (tpb, 48 pages, 1990)
Revolver:
Suburban Hell:
 "A Dog and His Bastard" (with Phillip Swarbrick, in Horror Special, 1990)
 "The One I Love" (with Glenn Fabry, in Romance Special, 1991)
Judge Dredd Megazine:
Chopper: Surf's Up (tpb, 304 pages, 2010) includes:
 "Earth, Wind and Fire" (with John McCrea, in vol.1 #1–6, 1990–1991)
 "Dead Man's Twist" (with Martin Emond, in vol.2 #36, 1993)
Judge Dredd:
 The Complete Case Files Volume 17 (tpb, 304 pages, 2011) includes:
 "Judgement Day" (with John Wagner, Dean Ormston and Chris Halls, in vol.2 #4–9, 1992)
 "The Taking of Sector 123" (with Carlos Ezquerra, in vol.2 #10–11, 1992)
 "Monkey on My Back" (with John Higgins, in #204–206, 2003)
 "Sleeze 'n' Ryder" (with Nick Percival, in vol.2 #19–26, 1993)
2000 AD:
Time Flies:
 "Time Flies" (with Philip Bond, in #700–711, 1990)
 "Tempus Fugitive" (with Philip Bond, John Beeston and Roger Langridge, in #1015–1023, 1996)
Judge Dredd:
 The Complete Case Files Volume 15 (tpb, 320 pages, 2010) includes:
 "Death Aid" (with Carlos Ezquerra, in #711–715 and 719–720, 1990–1991)
 "Emerald Isle" (with Steve Dillon and Will Simpson, in #727–732, 1991)
 "Return of the King" (with Carlos Ezquerra, in #733–735, 1991)
 The Complete Case Files Volume 16 (tpb, 320 pages, 2010) includes:
 "Firepower" (with Colin MacNeil, in #736, 1991)
 "Teddy Bear's Firefight" (with Brian Williamson, in #737, 1991)
 "Garbage Disposal" (with John Burns, in #738, 1991)
 "Talkback" (with Glenn Fabry, in #740, 1991)
 "Twin Blocks" (with Gary Erskine and Gina Hart, in #741, 1991)
 "School Bully" (with Simon Coleby and Gina Hart, in #742, 1991)
 "A Clockwork Pineapple" (with Simon Coleby, in #743–745, 1991)
 "Muzak Killer" (with Dermot Power, in #746–748, 1991)
 "The Vidders" (with Chris Weston, in #749, 1991)
 "Twilight's Last Gleaming" (with John Burns, in #754–756, 1991)
 "One Better" (with Jose Casanovas, in #757, 1991)
 "The Flabfighters" (with Simon Coleby, in #758–759, 1991)
 "Teddy Choppermitz" (with Dermot Power, in #760, 1991)
 "Rough Guide to Suicide" (with Greg Staples, in #761, 1991)
 "Justice One" (with Peter Doherty, in #766–771, 1992)
 "Koole Killers" (with Simon Coleby and Gina Hart, in #772–774, 1992)
 "First of the Many" (with Cliff Robinson and Gina Hart, in #775, 1992)
 The Complete Case Files Volume 17 (tpb, 304 pages, 2011) includes:
 "Babes in Arms" (with Greg Staples, in #776–779, 1992)
 "Almighty Dredd" (with Ian Gibson, in #780–782, 1992)
 "A Magic Place" (with Steve Dillon, Simon Coleby and Gina Hart, in #783–785, 1992)
 "Judgement Day" (with John Wagner, Peter Doherty and Carlos Ezquerra, in #786–799, 1992)
 "The Marshall" (with Sean Phillips, in #800–803, 1992)
 "Judge Joyce: When Irish Pies are Smiling" (with Steve Dillon, in Judge Dredd Annual '93, 1992)
 The Complete Case Files Volume 18 (tpb, 304 pages, 2011) includes:
 "Innocents Abroad" (with Greg Staples, in #804–807, 1992)
 "The Magic Mellow Out" (with Anthony Williams, in #808–809, 1992)
 "Raider" (with John Burns, in #810–814, 1992)
 "Christmas with Attitude" (with Carlos Ezquerra, in #815, 1992)
 "The Kinda Dead Man" (with Anthony Williams, in #816, 1993)
 "The Craftsman" (with John McCrea, in #817, 1993)
 "Ex-Men" (with John Higgins, in #818, 1993)
 "Snowstorm" (with Colin MacNeil, in #819, 1993)
 "PJ and the Mock-Choc Factory" (with Anthony Williams, in #820–822, 1993)
 "Last Night Out" (with Brett Ewins, in #823, 1993)
 "A, B or C Warrior" (with Ron Smith, in #824, 1993)
 "Blind Mate" (with Greg Staples, in #825, 1993)
 "Unwelcome Guests" (with Jeff Anderson, in #826, 1993)
 "Barfur" (with Jon Haward, in #827, 1993)
 "A Man Called Greener" (with Anthony Williams, in #828, 1993)
 The Complete Case Files Volume 19 (tpb, 320 pages, 2012) includes:
 "Enter: Jonni Kiss" (with Greg Staples, in #830, 1993)
 "The Judge Who Lives Downstairs" (with Brett Ewins, in #831, 1993)
 "The Chieftain" (with Mick Austin, in #832–834, 1993)
 "Muzak Killer: Live!" (with Dermot Power, in #837–839, 1993)
 "The Corps: Fireteam One" (with Paul Marshall and Colin MacNeil, in #918–923, 1994)
 "Goodnight Kiss" (with Nick Percival, in #940–948, 1995)
 "Helter Skelter" (with Carlos Ezquerra and Henry Flint, in #1250–1261, 2001)
Strontium Dogs:
 "Monsters" (with Steve Pugh, in #750–761, 1991)
 "Dead Man's Hand" (with Simon Harrison, in Yearbook '93, 1992)
 "Return of the Gronk" (with Nigel Dobbyn, in #817–824, 1993)
 "How the Gronk Got His Heartses" (with Nigel Dobbyn, in #850–851, 1993)
 "The Darkest Star" (with Nigel Dobbyn, in #855–866, 1993)

DC Comics
Titles published by DC Comics and its various imprints include:
The Demon Vol.3 #40, 42–58, 0, Annual #2 (with John McCrea, Nigel Dobbyn and Peter Snejbjerg, 1993–1995)
Hitman:
A Rage in Arkham (tpb, 144 pages, 2009) collects:
 "Untitled" (with John McCrea, in The Demon Annual #2, 1993)
 "Hitman" (with John McCrea, in Batman Chronicles #4, 1996)
 "A Rage in Arkham" (with John McCrea, in #1–3, 1996)
Ten Thousand Bullets (tpb, 176 pages, 2010) collects:
 "Ten Thousand Bullets" (with John McCrea, in #4–7, 1996)
 "The Night the Lights Went Out" (with John McCrea, in #8, 1996)
 "A Coffin Full of Dollars" (with Carlos Ezquerra and Steve Pugh, in Annual #1, 1996)
Local Heroes (tpb, 144 pages, 2010) collects:
 "Local Heroes" (with John McCrea, in #9–12, 1996–1997)
 "Zombie Night at the Gotham Aquarium" (with John McCrea, in #13–14, 1997)
Ace of Killers (tpb, 192 pages, 2011) collects:
 "Ace of Killers" (with John McCrea, in #15–20, 1997)
 "Kiss Me" (with Steve Pugh, in #21, 1997)
 "The Santa Contract" (with John McCrea, in #22, 1998)
Tommy's Heroes (tpb, 352 pages, 2011) collects:
 "Who Dares Wins" (with John McCrea, in #23–27, 1998)
 "Door into the Dark" (with John McCrea, in #28, 1998)
 "Tommy's Heroes" (with John McCrea, in #29–33, 1998–1999)
 "To Hell with the Future" (with John McCrea, in #1,000,000, 1998)
 "Of Thee I Sing" (with John McCrea, in #34, 1999)
 "Katie" (with John McCrea, in #35–36, 1999)
For Tomorrow (tpb, 336 pages, 2012) collects:
 "Dead Man's Land" (with John McCrea, in #37–38, 1999)
 "For Tomorrow" (with John McCrea, in #39–42, 1999)
 "The Morning After, The Night Before" (with John McCrea, in #43, 1999)
 "Fresh Meat" (with John McCrea, in #44–46, 1999–2000)
 "The Old Dog" (with John McCrea, in #47–50, 2000)
Closing Time (tpb, 384 pages, 2012) collects:
 "Super Guy" (with John McCrea, in #51–52, 2000)
 "Closing Time" (with John McCrea, in #53–60, 2000–2001)
 "How to Be a Super-Hero!" (with Nelson DeCastro, in Superman 80-Page Giant #1, 1999)
 Hitman/Lobo: That Stupid Bastich! (with Doug Mahnke, one-shot, 2000)
 JLA/Hitman #1–2 (with John McCrea, 2007)
Loaded (with Greg Staples, one-shot, Interplay Productions, 1995) (Free video game tie-in, 10 pages, polybagged with Preacher #12 and Invisibles #19)
Bloody Mary (tpb, 192 pages, 2005) collects:
Bloody Mary #1–4 (with Carlos Ezquerra, Helix, 1996)
Bloody Mary: Lady Liberty #1–4 (with Carlos Ezquerra, Helix, 1997)
Batman: Legends of the Dark Knight #91–93: "Freakout" (with Will Simpson, 1997)
Enemy Ace: War in Heaven #1–2 (with Chris Weston and Russ Heath, 2001) collected as Enemy Ace: War in Heaven (tpb, 128 pages, 2003)
All-Star Section 8 #1–6 (with John McCrea, 2015) collected as All-Star Section 8 (tpb, 2016)
Sixpack and Dogwelder: Hard-Travelin' Heroz #1–6 (with Russ Braun, 2016-2017) collected as Sixpack and Dogwelder: Hard-Travelin' Heroz (tpb, 144 pages, 2017)
Dastardly and Muttley #1-6 (with Mauricet, 2017-2018), collected as Dastardly and Muttley (tpb, 160 pages, 2018)
 Batman: Reptilian #1-6 (with Liam Sharp, 2021)

Vertigo

Hellblazer:
Dangerous Habits (tpb, 160 pages, 1994) collects:
 "Dangerous Habits" (with Will Simpson, in #41–46, 1991)
Bloodlines (tpb, 296 pages, 2007) collects:
 "The Pub Where I Was Born" (with Will Simpson, in #47, 1991)
 "Love Kills" (with Mike Hoffman, in #48, 1991)
 "Lord of the Dance" (with Steve Dillon, in #49, 1992)
 "Remarkable Lives" (with Will Simpson, in #50, 1992)
 "Royal Blood" (with Will Simpson, in #52–55, 1992)
 "This is the Diary of Danny Drake" (with David Lloyd, in #56, 1992)
 "Guys and Dolls" (with Will Simpson, in #59–61, 1992–1993)
 "Mortal Clay" (with Steve Dillon, in #57, 1992)
 "Body and Soul" (with Steve Dillon, in #58, 1992)
Fear and Loathing (tpb, 160 pages, 1997) collects:
 "End of the Line" (with Steve Dillon, in #62, 1993)
 "Forty" (with Steve Dillon, in #63, 1993)
 "Fear and Loathing" (with Steve Dillon, in #64–66, 1993)
 "End of the Line" (with Steve Dillon, in #67, 1993)
Tainted Love (tpb, 176 pages, 1998) collects:
 Hellblazer Special: "Confessional" (with Steve Dillon, one-shot, 1993)
 "Down All the Days" (with Steve Dillon, in #68, 1993)
 "Rough Trade" (with Steve Dillon, in #69, 1993)
 "Heartland" (with Steve Dillon, in #70, 1993)
 "Finest Hour" (with Steve Dillon, in #71, 1993)
 Vertigo Jam: "Tained Love" (with Steve Dillon, one-shot, 1993)
Damnation's Flame (tpb, 176 pages, 1999) collects:
 "Damnation's Flame" (with Steve Dillon, in #72–75, 1993–1994)
 "Confessions of an Irish Rebel" (with Steve Dillon, in #76, 1994)
 "And the Crowd Goes Wild" (with Peter Snejbjerg, in #77, 1994)
Rake at the Gates of Hell (tpb, 224 pages, 2003) collects:
 "Rake at the Gates of Hell" (with Steve Dillon, in #78–83, 1994)
 Heartland (with Steve Dillon, one-shot, 1997)
Son of Man (tpb, 128 pages, 2004) collects:
 "Son of Man" (with John Higgins, in #129–133, 1998)
 "All Those Little Girls and Boys" (with Glyn Dillon, in Vertigo: Winter's Edge #2, 1999)
Preacher:
Book One (hc, 352 pages, 2009) collects:
 "Gone to Texas" (with Steve Dillon, in #1–7, 1995)
 "Until the End of the World" (with Steve Dillon, in #8–12, 1995–1996)
Book Two (hc, 368 pages, 2010) collects:
 "Hunters" (with Steve Dillon, in #13–17, 1996)
 "Proud Americans" (with Steve Dillon, in #18–26, 1996–1997)
Book Three (hc, 352 pages, 2010) collects:
 "Dixie Fried" (with Steve Dillon, in #27–33, 1997–1998)
 Preacher Special: Saint of Killers #1–4 (with Steve Pugh, 1996)
 Cassidy: Blood and Whiskey (with Steve Dillon, one-shot, 1998)
Book Four (hc, 368 pages, 2011) collects:
 The Story of You-Know-Who (with Richard Case, one-shot, 1996)
 "War in the Sun" (with Steve Dillon, in #34–40, 1997–1998)
 The Good Old Boys (with Carlos Ezquerra, one-shot, 1997)
 One Man's War (with Peter Snejbjerg, one-shot, 1998)
Book Five (hc, 368 pages, 2011) collects:
 "Salvation" (with Steve Dillon, in #41–50, 1998–1999)
 "Even Hitgirls Get the Blues" (with Steve Dillon, in #51–54, 1999)
Book Six (hc, 384 pages, 2012) collects:
 "All Hell's A-Coming" (with Steve Dillon, in #55–58, 1999–2000)
 Tall in the Saddle (with Steve Dillon, one-shot, 2000)
 "Alamo" (with Steve Dillon, in #59–66, 2000)
Goddess #1–8 (with Phil Winslade, 1995) collected as Goddess (tpb, 256 pages, 2002)
Unknown Soldier #1–4 (with Killian Plunkett, 1997) collected Unknown Soldier (tpb, 112 pages, 1998)
Pride and Joy #1–4 (with John Higgins, 1997) collected as Pride and Joy (tpb, 104 pages, 2004)
Flinch #3: "Satanic" (with Kieron Dwyer, 1999)
Weird War Tales Special: "Nosh and Barry and Eddie and Joe" (with Jim Lee, 2000)
Adventures in the Rifle Brigade (tpb, 144 pages, 2005) collects:
Adventures in the Rifle Brigade #1–3 (with Carlos Ezquerra, 2000)
Adventures in the Rifle Brigade: Operation Bollock #1–3 (with Carlos Ezquerra, 2001)
War Stories:
Volume 1 (tpb, 240 pages, 2004) collects:
 War Story: Johann's Tiger (with Chris Weston, one-shot, 2001)
 War Story: D-Day Dodgers (with John Higgns, one-shot, 2001)
 War Story: Screaming Eagles (with Dave Gibbons, one-shot, 2002)
 War Story: Nightingale (with David Lloyd, one-shot, 2002)
Volume 2 (tpb, 240 pages, 2006) collects:
 War Story: The Reivers (with Cam Kennedy, one-shot, 2003)
 War Story: J for Jenny (with David Lloyd, one-shot, 2003)
 War Story: Condors (with Carlos Ezquerra, one-shot, 2003)
 War Story: Archangel (with Gary Erskine, one-shot, 2003)

Wildstorm
Kev Hawkins:
The Authority: Kev (tpb, 144 pages, 2005) collects:
 The Authority: Kev (with Glenn Fabry, 2002)
 The Authority: More Kev #1–4 (with Glenn Fabry, 2004)
The Authority: The Magnificent Kevin #1–5 (with Carlos Ezquerra, 2005–2006) collected as The Authority: The Magnificent Kevin (tpb, 112 pages, 2006)
A Man Called Kev #1–5 (with Carlos Ezquerra, 2006–2007) collected as A Man Called Kev (tpb, 112 pages, 2007)
Battler Britton #1–5 (with Colin Wilson, 2006–2007) collected as Battler Britton: Bloody Good Show (tpb, 120 pages, 2007)
The Boys #1–6 (with Darick Robertson, 2006–2007) collected as The Boys: The Name of the Game (tpb, 152 pages, 2008)
 The series was cancelled and later continued under Dynamite.
Midnighter #1–6 (with Chris Sprouse and Glenn Fabry, 2007) collected as Midnighter: Killing Machine (tpb, 144 pages, 2007)

Marvel Comics
Titles published by Marvel include:
Punisher:
The Punisher by Garth Ennis Omnibus (hc, 1136 pages, 2008) collects:
 Punisher Kills the Marvel Universe (with Doug Braithwaite, one-shot, 1995)
 The Punisher v3 #1–12: "Welcome Back, Frank" (with Steve Dillon, 2000–2001)
 The Punisher v4:
 "Army of One" (with Steve Dillon, in #1–5, 2001)
 "Do Not Fall in New York City" (with Steve Dillon, in #6, 2002)
 "Business as Usual" (with Steve Dillon, in #13–14, 2002)
 "The Exclusive" (with Darick Robertson, in #15, 2002)
 "Vertical Challenge" (with Darick Robertson, in #16–17, 2002)
 "Downtown" (with Steve Dillon, in #18, 2002)
 "Of Mice and Men" (with Steve Dillon, in #19, 2003)
 "Brotherhood" (with Steve Dillon, in #20–22, 2003)
 "Squid" (with Steve Dillon, in #23, 2003)
 "Hidden" (with Tom Mandrake, in #24–26, 2003)
 "Elektra" (with Tom Mandrake, in #27, 2003)
 "Streets of Laredo" (with Cam Kennedy, in #28–31, 2003)
 "Soap" (with Steve Dillon, in #32, 2003)
 "Confederacy of Dunces" (with John McCrea, in #33–37, 2003–2004)
 Marvel Knights Double Shot #1: "Roots" (with Joe Quesada, 2002)
The Punisher/Painkiller Jane: "Lovesick" (with Joe Jusko and Dave Ross, one-shot, 2001)
The Punisher: War Zone v2 #1–6 (with Steve Dillon, 2009) collected as The Punisher: War Zone – The Resurrection of Ma Gnucci (hc, 144 pages, 2009, ; tpb, 2009)
Punisher MAX:
Born #1–4 (with Darick Robertson, 2003) collected as Punisher MAX: Born (hc, 112 pages, 2004, ; tpb, 2007)
Punisher v5:
 Volume 1 (hc, 304 pages, 2005) collects:
 "In the Beginning" (with Lewis LaRosa, in #1–6, 2004)
 "Kitchen Irish" (with Leandro Fernández, in #7–12, 2004)
 Volume 2 (hc, 296 pages, 2006) collects:
 "Mother Russia" (with Doug Braithwaite, in #13–18, 2005)
 "Up is Down and Black is White" (with Leandro Fernández, in #19–24, 2005)
 Volume 3 (hc, 296 pages, 2007) collects:
 "The Slavers" (with Leandro Fernández, in #25–30, 2005–2006)
 "Barracuda" (with Goran Parlov, in #31–36, 2006)
 Volume 4 (hc, 312 pages, 2008) collects:
 "Man of Stone" (with Leandro Fernández, in #37–42, 2006–2007)
 "Widowmaker" (with Lan Medina, in #43–49, 2007)
 Volume 5 (hc, 280 pages, 2009) collects:
 "Long Cold Dark" (with Howard Chaykin and Goran Parlov, in #50–54, 2007–2008)
 "Valley Forge, Valley Forge" (with Goran Parlov, in #55–60, 2008)
 From First to Last (hc, 152 pages, 2006, ; tpb, 2007) collects:
 The End (with Richard Corben, one-shot, 2004)
 The Cell (with Lewis LaRosa, one-shot, 2005)
 The Tyger (with John Severin, one-shot, 2006)
Barracuda #1–5 (with Goran Parlov, 2007) collected as Punisher MAX Presents: Barracuda (tpb, 120 pages, 2007)
The Platoon #1-6 (with Goran Parlov, 2017-2018) collected as Punisher: The Platoon (tpb, 136 pages, 2018)
Soviet #1-6 (with Jacen Burrows, 2019-2020)
The Punisher: Countdown (with Steve Dillon, 2004)
Hulk Smash! #1–2 (with John McCrea, 2001) collected in Hulk: Dead Like Me (tpb, 144 pages, 2004)
Spider-Man's Tangled Web #1–3: "The Coming of the Thousand" (with John McCrea, 2001) collected in Volume 1 (tpb, 144 pages, 2002)
Nick Fury:
Fury #1–6 (with Darick Robertson, MAX, 2001) collected as Fury (tpb, 144 pages, 2002)
Fury: Peacemaker #1–6 (with Darick Robertson, 2006) collected as Fury: Peacemaker (tpb, 144 pages, 2006)
Fury: My War Gone By #1–13 (with Goran Parlov, 2012–2013)
Thor: Vikings #1–5 (with Glenn Fabry, MAX, 2003–2004) collected as Thor: Vikings (tpb, 128 pages, 2004)
Ghost Rider (with Clayton Crain):
Ghost Rider #1–6 (2005–2006) collected as Road to Damnation (hc, 144 pages, 2006, ; tpb, 2007)
Ghost Rider: Trail of Tears #1–6 (2007) collected as Trail of Tears (hc, 144 pages, 2007, ; tpb, 2008)
Phantom Eagle:
War is Hell: The First Flight of the Phantom Eagle #1–5 (with Howard Chaykin, MAX, 2008) collected as War is Hell: The First Flight of the Phantom Eagle (hc, 120 pages, 2008, ; tpb, 2009)
Where Monsters Dwell #1–5 (with Russ Heath, 2015) collected as Where Monsters Dwell: The Phantom Eagles Flies the Savage Skies (Secret Wars: Warzones!) (tpb, 112 pages, 2016)

Avatar Press
Titles published by Avatar include:
Garth Ennis' Dicks (with John McCrea):
Bigger Dicks #1–4 (2002) collected as Dicks (tpb, 176 pages, 2003)
Dicks 2 #1–4 (2002)
X-Mas Special (one-shot, 2003)
Winter Special (one-shot, 2005)
Dicks (2012) collected as:
 Volume 1 (collects #1–5, tpb, 176 pages, 2012)
 Volume 2 (collects #6–10, tpb, 176 pages, 2013)
Dicks: End of Time #1–6 (2014)
303 #1–6 (with Jacen Burrows, 2004–2005) collected as 303 (tpb, 144 pages, 2007)
Chronicles of Wormwood:
Chronicles of Wormwood #1–6 (with Jacen Burrows, 2006–2007) collected as Volume 1 (tpb, 144 pages, 2007)
The Last Enemy (with Rob Steen, graphic novel, tpb, 48 pages, 2007)
The Last Battle #1–6 (with Oscar Jimenez, 2009–2011) collected as Volume 2 (tpb, 160 pages, 2011)
Streets of Glory #1–6 (with Mike Wolfer, 2007) collected as Streets of Glory (hc, 160 pages, 2009, ; tpb, 2009)
Crossed (with Jacen Burrows):
Crossed #0–9 (2008–2010) collected as Volume 1 (hc, 240 pages, 2010, ; tpb, 2010)
Crossed: Badlands #1–3 (2012) collected in Volume 4 (hc, 240 pages, 2012, ; tpb, 2012)
Crossed: Badlands #25–28 (2013) collected in Volume 6 
Crossed: Badlands #50–56 (2014) collected in Volume 10 (tpb, 176 pages, 2014, 
Crossed: Dead or Alive #1–12 (web comic, 2014–2015)
Stitched #1–7 (with Mike Wolfer, 2012) collected as Stitched (hc, 176 pages, 2012, ; tpb, 2012)
Rover Red Charlie #1–6 (with Michael Dipascale, 2013) collected as Rover Red Charlie Volume 1 (tpb, 160 pages, 2014)
Caliban #1–7 (with Facundo Percio, 2014) collected as Caliban (tpb, 176 pages, 2014)
War Stories Volume 2 #1-26 (continuation of Vertigo series)
Volume 3 (tpb, 224 pages, 2016) collects:
"Castles in the Sky" (in #1–3, with Matt Martin, 2014) 
"Children of Israel" (in #4–6, with Tomas Aria, 2015)
"The Last German Winter" (in #7–9, with Tomas Aria, 2015) 
Volume 4 (tpb, 144 pages, 2016) collects:
"Our Wild Geese Go" (in #10–12, with Tomas Aria, 2015)
"Tokyo Club" (in #13–15, with Tomas Aria, 2015)
Volume 5 (tpb, 144 pages, 2017) collects:
"Send A Gunboat" (in #16-18, with Tomas Aria, 2016)
"Vampire Squadrion" (in #19–22, with Tomas Aria, 2016)
Code Pru #1-2 (With Raulo Caceres, 2015)

Dynamite Entertainment
Titles published by Dynamite include:
Dan Dare #1–7 (with Gary Erskine, 2008) collected as Dan Dare (tpb, 2009)
The Boys:
Volume 1: The Name of The Game (hc, 368 pages, 2008) collects:
 "The Name of the Game" (with Darick Robertson, in #1–2, 2006)
 "Cherry" (with Darick Robertson, in #3–6, 2006–2007)
 "Get Some" (with Darick Robertson, in #7–9, 2007)
 "Glorious Five Year Plan" (with Darick Robertson, in #10–14, 2007–2008)
 Volume 2: Get Some (hc, 368 pages, 2009) collects:
 "Good for the Soul" (with Darick Robertson, in #15–18, 2008)
 "I Tell You No Lie, G.I." (with Darick Robertson, in #19–22, 2008)
 "We Gotta Go Now" (with Darick Robertson and John Higgins, in #23–29, 2008–2009)
 "Rodeo Fuck" (with Darick Robertson, in #30, 2009)
 Volume 3: Good for the Soul (hc, 368 pages, 2011) collects:
 Herogasm #1–6 (with Keith Burns and John McCrea, 2009)
 "The Self-Preservation Society" (with Carlos Ezquerra and John McCrea, in #31–34, 2009)
 "Nothing Like It in the World" (with Darick Robertson, in #35–36, 2009–2010)
 "La Plume De Ma Tante Est Sur La Table" (with Darick Robertson, in #37, 2010)
 "The Instant White-Hot Wild" (with Darick Robertson, in #38, 2010)
 Volume 4: We Gotta Go Now (hc, 400 pages, 2012) collects:
 "What I Know" (with Keith Burns and John McCrea, in #39, 2010)
 "The Innocents" (with Darick Robertson, in #40–43, 2010)
 "Believe" (with Russell Braun, in #44–47, 2010)
 Highland Laddie #1–6 (with Keith Burns and John McCrea, 2010–2011)
 Volume 5: Herogasm (hc, 430 pages, 2013) collects:
 "Proper Preparation and Planning" (with Russell Braun, in #48–51, 2010–2011)
 "Barbary Coast" (with Keith Burns and John McCrea, in #52–55, 2011)
 "The Big Ride" (with Russell Braun, in #56–59, 2011)
 Butcher, Baker, Candlestick Maker #1–6 (with Darick Robertson, 2011)
 Volume 6: Self Preservation Society (hc, 368 pages, 2013) collects:
 "Over the Hill with the Swords of a Thousand Men" (with Russell Braun, in #60–65, 2011–2012)
 "The Bloody Doors Off" (with Russell Braun, in #66–71, 2012)
 "You Found Me" (with Darick Robertson, in #72, 2012)
Battlefields:
The Complete Garth Ennis' Battlefields Volume 1 (hc, 268 pages, 2009) collects:
 Night Witches #1–3 (with Russell Braun, 2008)
 Dear Billy #1–3 (with Peter Snejbjerg, 2009)
 The Tankies #1–3 (with Carlos Ezquerra, 2009)
The Complete Garth Ennis' Battlefields Volume 2 (hc, 200 pages, 2011) collects:
 "Happy Valley" (with P. J. Holden, in #1–3, 2009–2010)
 "The Firefly and His Majesty" (with Carlos Ezquerra, in #4–6, 2010)
 "Motherland" (with Russell Braun, in #7–9, 2010)
The Complete Garth Ennis' Battlefields Volume 3 (hc, 144 pages, 2014) collects:
 "The Green Fields Beyond" (with Carlos Ezquerra, in #1–3, 2012–2013)
 "The Fall and Rise of Anna Kharkova" (with Russell Braun, in #4–6, 2013)
Jennifer Blood #1–6 (with Adriano Batista, Marcos Marz and Kewber Baal, 2011) collected as Garth Ennis' Jennifer Blood: A Woman's Work Is Never Done (tpb, 144 pages, 2012)
The Shadow #1–6 (with Aaron Campbell, 2012) collected as The Shadow: Fire of Creation (tpb, 144 pages, 2012)
Erf (with Rob Steen, 2013, hardcover, 48 pages)
Red Team #1–7 (with Craig Cermak, 2013–2014) collected as Garth Ennis' Red Team Volume 1 (tpb, 152 pages, 2014)
A Train Called Love #1–10 (with Marc Dos Santos, 2015–2016)
Just a Pilgrim (hc, 200 pages, Dynamite, 2008, ; tpb, 2009) collects:
Just a Pilgrim #1–5 (with Carlos Ezquerra, Black Bull, 2001)
Just a Pilgrim: Garden of Eden #1–4 (with Carlos Ezquerra, Black Bull, 2002)

Other publishers
Titles published by various British and American publishers include:
A1 #6A: "And They Never Get Drunk but Stay Sober" (with Steve Dillon, Atomeka, 1992)
Top Cow:
Medieval Spawn/Witchblade #1–3 (with Brandon Peterson, 1996) collected as Medieval Spawn/Witchblade (tpb, 96 pages, 1997)
The Darkness (with Marc Silvestri, Malachy Coney, Joe Benitez and others, 1996–1998) collected as:
 Coming of Age (collects #1–6, tpb, 176 pages, 2001)
 Heart of Darkness (collects #11–14, tpb, 144 pages, 2001)
Shadow Man #1–4: "Deadside" (with Ashley Wood, Acclaim, 1997)
Dicks #1–4 (with John McCrea, Caliber, 1997)
 Adaptation/sequel to For a Few Troubles More.
 The mini-series was later reprinted and expanded (as Bigger Dicks, by Avatar, 2002).
Painkiller Jane vs. the Darkness: Stripper (with Amanda Conner, Event, one-shot, 1997)
Tales of Midnight: "Such a Perfect Day" (with Dave Gibbons, Blue Silver, 1999)
The Worm: The Longest Comic Strip in the World: "In the End There Was the Worm Again" (with Alan Moore and "a galaxy of greats", graphic novel, tpb, 64 pages, Slab-O-Concrete, 1999)
Bart Simpson's Treehouse of Horror #7: "In Springfield, No-One Can Hear You Scream" (with John McCrea, Bongo, 2001) collected in Treehouse of Horror: Fun-Filled Frightfest (tpb, 128 pages, HarperCollins, 2003)
Dark Horse
Star Wars Tales:
Volume 3 (tpb, 232 pages, 2003) includes:
 "Trooper" (with John McCrea, in #10, 2001)
 "In the Beginning" (with Amanda Conner, in #11, 2002)
World of Tanks:
World of Tanks #1-5 (with Carlos Ezquerra and P.J. Holden, 2016-2017)
World of Tanks: Citadel #1-5 (with P.J. Holden, 2018)
Image:
The Pro (with Amanda Conner, graphic novel, tpb, 58 pages, 2002)
Back to Brooklyn #1–5 (with Jimmy Palmiotti and Mihailio Vukelic, 2008) collected as Back to Brooklyn (tpb, 128 pages, 2009)
CBLDF Presents: Liberty Comics:
 "The Boys" (with Darick Robertson, in #1, 2008)
 "The Comic That Got the Legend Fired" (with Rob Steen, in Annual '10, 2010)
Virgin:
7 Brothers #1–5 (with John Woo and Jeevan Kang, 2006) collected as John Woo's Seven Brothers: Sons of Heaven, Son of Hell (tpb, 144 pages, 2007)
Dan Dare #1–7 (with Gary Erskine, 2007–2008) collected as Dan Dare Omnibus (hc, 208 pages, 2009, ; tpb, 2009)
Titan Comics:
Johnny Red #1–8 (with Keith Burns, 2015–2016)
Red Horse (with Frank Victoria, digital Electricomics app)
Aftershock:
Dreaming Eagles #1–6 (with Simon Coleby, 2015–2016) collected as Dreaming Eagles (hc, 168 pages, 2016)
Jimmy's Bastards #1–9 (with Russ Braun, 2017–2018) collected as:
Jimmy's Bastards: Trigger Warning (collects #1–5, tpb, 120 pages, 2018)
Jimmy's Bastards: What Did You Just Say? (collects #6–9, tpb, 120 pages, 2018)
A Walk Through Hell #1–Ongoing (with Goran Sudžuka, 2018–Ongoing) collected as:
A Walk Through Hell Volume 1: The Warehouse (collects #1–5, tpb, 120 pages, 2018)
A Walk Through Hell Volume 2: The Cathedral (collects #6–12, tpb, 160 pages, 2019)
Out of the Blue 2 volumes (with Keith Burns, 2020) collected as:
Out of the Blue: The Complete Series (HC, 152 pages, 2020)
TKO Studios:
Sara #1-6 (with Steve Epting and Elizabeth Breitweiser, 2018)
Rebellion Developments:
Battle Action (anthology with various artists, 2022)

References

External links

 Garth Ennis at 2000 AD online

Living people
People educated at Sullivan Upper School
People from Holywood, County Down
Eisner Award winners for Best Writer
1970 births
Comics writers from Northern Ireland
Atheists from Northern Ireland
Northern Ireland emigrants to the United States
Writers from Belfast
Male writers from Northern Ireland
21st-century writers from Northern Ireland
Marvel Comics people
Avatar Press
Naturalized citizens of the United States
Critics of religions